Devade is a genus of  cribellate araneomorph spiders in the family Dictynidae, and was first described by Eugène Simon in 1884. Originally placed with the Amaurobiidae, it was moved to the intertidal spiders in 1983, then to the Dictynidae in 1989.

Species
 it contains ten species:
Devade dubia Caporiacco, 1934 – Karakorum
Devade indistincta (O. Pickard-Cambridge, 1872) (type) – Mediterranean
Devade kazakhstanica Esyunin & Efimik, 2000 – Kazakhstan
Devade lehtineni Esyunin & Efimik, 2000 – Kazakhstan
Devade libanica (Denis, 1955) – Lebanon
Devade miranda Ponomarev, 2007 – Kazakhstan
Devade mongolica Esyunin & Marusik, 2001 – Mongolia
Devade naderii Zamani & Marusik, 2017 – Iran
Devade pusilla Simon, 1911 – Algeria
Devade tenella (Tyschchenko, 1965) – Ukraine to China, Iran

References

Araneomorphae genera
Dictynidae
Spiders of Africa
Spiders of Asia
Taxa named by Eugène Simon